The Indianapolis Tennis Center, originally known as the Indianapolis Sports Center, was a tennis stadium complex with additional outdoor and indoor tennis courts on the campus of Indiana University – Purdue University Indianapolis (IUPUI) in Indianapolis, Indiana. The stadium, which seated 10,000 spectators, was built in 1979. At that time it was the venue for the U.S. Men's Clay Court Championships  tournament. It was also the site of the tennis events for the 1987 Pan American Games.

When originally constructed, the  complex included 14 outdoor courts, all of which, including the stadium court, had a clay surface. In 1989 an indoor facility featuring six DecoTurf Ii courts was added, and the stadium court and other outdoor courts were converted from clay to DecoTurf. Due to the change in playing surface, the name of the tournament was changed to the RCA Tennis Championships. The name of the tournament changed again to the Indianapolis Tennis Championships in 2007 due to the loss of the RCA sponsorship.

Changes to the date of the tournament to a less desirable point in the ATP tour combined with the loss of sponsorship resulted in the tournament being sold and moved to Atlanta, Georgia. Maintenance costs due to the loss of tournament income plus IUPUI's need for the land for future development led to the closure of the facility in August 2010 and its subsequent demolition that year.

See also
 List of tennis stadiums by capacity

References

External links 
Indianapolis Tennis Championships
Wikimapia
World Stadiums website

Sports venues in Indianapolis
Atlanta Open (tennis)
Tennis venues in Indiana
1979 establishments in Indiana
Sports venues completed in 1979
2010 disestablishments in Indiana
Sports venues demolished in 2010